Onye P. Ozuzu is dean of the University of Florida College of the Arts. According to her website, she is a "dance administrator, performing artist, choreographer, educator, and researcher". Ozuzu has presented nationally and internationally.

References

External links
Ozuzu Dances

Living people
Florida State University alumni
University of Florida faculty
Year of birth missing (living people)